Sensuality – The Remix Album is the first compilation album, third album overall, by German eurodance/trance project S.E.X. Appeal. The album was released 2008. Next to the remixes of their previous studio album "Sensuality", the album consists of two new songs, the album's lead single "Voodoo queen" and the previously unreleased song "Face 2 face".

Track listing 

   Sensuality (Bass Up Remix) - 5:21
   Voodoo queen - 5:00
   Love 2 love (Seventy 4 Remix) - 3:52
   Sensuality (Addicted Craze Remix) - 5:57
   Skin 2 skin (Club Mix Radio Cut) - 4:07
   Livin' a lie (Scoon & Delore Remix) - 4:12
   Fly away (Marc de Buur Remix) - 5:32
   Love 2 love (De Lorean Electro Mix) - 3:34
   Sensuality (Groove T Remix) - 6:58
   Let me feel your sexappeal (C.c.K & ClubBazZ Remix) - 4:06
   Skin 2 skin (Bass Up Remix) - 5:25
   Love me or leave me (Groove T Remix) - 6:33
   Sensuality (Kevin Stomper Remix) - 3:43
   Face 2 face - 3:42

2008 albums
S.E.X. Appeal albums